Branched bur-reed is a common name for several plants in the genus Sparganium and may refer to:

Sparganium androcladum, commonly referred to as "branched bur-reed" in North America
Sparganium erectum, commonly referred to as "branched bur-reed" in the United Kingdom